Windows Polytonic Greek is a modification of Windows-1253 that was used by Paratype to cover Polytonic Greek. This encoding is supported by FontLab Studio 5.

Character set
The following table shows Windows Polytonic Greek. Each character is shown with its Unicode equivalent. Note that the older FontLab mapping swaps 0xB5 and 0xFF.

References

Windows code pages